Margallo is a surname. Notable people with the surname include:

José Manuel García-Margallo (born 1944), Spanish politician
Juan García y Margallo (1839–1893), Spanish general
Juan Margallo (born 1940), Spanish actor, theater director, and dramaturge